Marciano Kastoredjo (born 22 March 1982 in Utrecht) is a Dutch footballer who played for Eerste Divisie club De Graafschap during the 2003-2004 football season.

References

External links
voetbal international profile
Profile at Eurosport

1982 births
Living people
Dutch footballers
Footballers from Utrecht (city)
De Graafschap players
Eerste Divisie players
Association football defenders